William Alexander Leighton (8 December 1914 – 1981) was an English footballer who played in the Football League as a forward for Newcastle United and Southend United.

Career

Born in Walker, Newcastle upon Tyne, Leighton joined Newcastle United from local amateur football. After signing in February 1932 from Walker Park, he made his Football League debut on 4 February 1933 in a First Division 2–0 win over Chelsea. He scored his first goal for the club on 21 March 1934 in a 1–1 away draw with Manchester City.

Leighton made a total of 39 appearances in the First and Second Divisions for Newcastle between 1932 and 1938. He was widely seen as a second-choice player, and after making his final appearance in a 1–0 defeat against Barnsley at St James' Park on 1 September 1937, Leighton moved to Southend United in search of first-team football.

Leighton made 16 league appearances for Southend, scoring twice, but was unable to secure a regular starting position due to the Second World War as all leagues were suspended. He also had a brief spell with Southend-based team EKCO Sports.

Towards the end of the war, with Leighton stationed at Colchester Garrison, he signed briefly with Colchester United who played in the Southern League which had restarted for the 1945–46 season. He made his debut for the U's on 29 December 1945 in a 1–0 defeat to Cheltenham Town at Whaddon Road. He made three Southern League appearances for Colchester and made his final appearance for the club in a Southern League Cup victory against Guildford City on 19 January 1946.

Billy Leighton died in 1981.

References

1914 births
1981 deaths
Footballers from Newcastle upon Tyne
English footballers
Association football forwards
Newcastle United F.C. players
Southend United F.C. players
Colchester United F.C. players
English Football League players
Southern Football League players
British Army personnel of World War II